The 2001 CAF Champions League was the 37th awarding of Africa's premier club football tournament prize organized by the Confederation of African Football (CAF), and the 5th prize under the CAF Champions League format.

In the knockout stage, was added the semifinal rounds so that the runners up as well as the winners from the group stage would progress. In the final, Al Ahly of Egypt defeated Mamelodi Sundowns of South Africa to win their third title.

Qualifying rounds

Preliminary round

First round

1 The match was abandoned at 80' with Young Africans leading 2–0 and about to take a penalty, after local fans hurled plastic chairs onto the pitch and at the players and officials.

Second round

Group stage

Group A

Group B

Knockout stage

Bracket

Semifinals

Final

Top goalscorers

The top scorers from the 2001 CAF Champions League are as follows:

External links
Champions' Cup 2001 - rsssf.com

 
1
CAF Champions League seasons